Drijen may refer to:
 Drijen (Derventa), Bosnia and Herzegovina
 Drijen (Kakanj), Bosnia and Herzegovina